Kot Lakhpat railway station (Urdu and )  is located in Kot Lakhpat town, Lahore district of Punjab province, Pakistan.

See also
 List of railway stations in Pakistan
 Pakistan Railways

References

External links

Railway stations in Lahore District
Railway stations on Karachi–Peshawar Line (ML 1)